The Baldwin Stakes is an American Thoroughbred horse race held annually in early March at Santa Anita Park in Arcadia, California. A Grade III event for three-year-old horses, it is contested on turf at a distance of five and one-half furlongs, since 2020.

The race was transferred to Santa Anita's dirt track in 1979, 1982, 1983, 1986, 1991, 1992, 1995, 2000, 2001, 2005 and 2006. It was run in two divisions in 1968 and again in 1988.

Records
Speed  record: (on turf)
 1:11.96 – Desert code (2007)

Most wins by an owner:
 2 – Mr./Mrs. Howard B. Keck (1968, 1969)

Most wins by a jockey:
 5 – Ed Delahoussaye (1982, 1988, 1989, 1995, 1998)

Most wins by a trainer:
 3 – Charles Whittingham (1968, 1969, 1971)

Winners

References
 The 2008 Baldwin Stakes at Breeders' Cup.com
 The story of Lucky Baldwin

Graded stakes races in the United States
Horse races in California
Turf races in the United States
Flat horse races for three-year-olds
Recurring sporting events established in 1968
Santa Anita Park
1968 establishments in California